This list of mayors Badalona starts in 1835, after the reform of the ayuntamientos by the central government, during the regency of Maria Christina of the Two Sicilies. Currently the mayor is the head of the government and the municipal administration. It has several functions, including representing the city council in all the officials acts, summons and chairs the plenary sessions and the local government council.

References 

Lists of mayors of places in Spain
Badalona